28th meridian may refer to:

28th meridian east, a line of longitude east of the Greenwich Meridian
28th meridian west, a line of longitude west of the Greenwich Meridian